This article presents a list of the historical events and publications of Australian literature during 1924.

Books 
 Dale Collins – Ordeal : A Novel
 Dulcie Deamer – The Devil's Saint
 Mabel Forrest – The Wild Moth
 Arthur Gask – The Secret of the Garden
 D. H. Lawrence & M. L. Skinner – The Boy in the Bush
 Vance Palmer – Cronulla: A Story of Station Life
 Steele Rudd – Me an' th' Son
 Ethel Turner – Nicola Silver

Short stories
 Katharine Susannah Prichard – "The Grey Horse"

Children's and Young Adult fiction 
 Charles Barrett – Bushland Babies
 Mary Grant Bruce – Billabong's Daughter
 Jean Curlewis – The Dawn Man
 May Gibbs – Chucklebud and Wunkydoo
 Lilian Turner – Jill of the Fourth Form

Poetry 

 Robert Crawford – "Shadow Song"
 Dulcie Deamer – "Messalina"
 C. J. Dennis – Rose of Spadgers
 Mary Gilmore – "The Brucedale Scandal"
 Henry Lawson – Humorous Verses
 Dorothea Mackellar
 "Australian Autumn"
 "Heritage"
 "An Old Song"
 Jack Moses – "Nine Miles From Gundagai"
 John Shaw Neilson 
 "Love in Absence"
 "So Sweet a Mouth Has She"
 Will H. Ogilvie – "The Death of Ben Hall"
 Dowell O'Reilly – The Prose and Verse of Dowell O'Reilly
 Kenneth Slessor
 "Thief of the Moon"
 "Undine"

Drama 
 Vance Palmer – The Black Horse and Other Plays

Births 

A list, ordered by date of birth (and, if the date is either unspecified or repeated, ordered alphabetically by surname) of births in 1924 of Australian literary figures, authors of written works or literature-related individuals follows, including year of death.

 31 May – Patsy Adam-Smith, author (died 2001)
 27 August – David Rowbotham, poet (died 2010)
 1 October – Leonie Kramer, academic and critic (died 2016)
Unknown date
 Deirdre Cash (Criena Rohan), Australian novelist (died 1963)

Deaths 

A list, ordered by date of death (and, if the date is either unspecified or repeated, ordered alphabetically by surname) of deaths in 1924 of Australian literary figures, authors of written works or literature-related individuals follows, including year of birth.

 11 March – Archibald Meston, journalist and explorer (born 1851)

See also 
 1924 in poetry
 List of years in literature
 List of years in Australian literature
 1924 in literature
 1923 in Australian literature
 1924 in Australia
 1925 in Australian literature

References

Literature
Australian literature by year
20th-century Australian literature